Barys Nur-Sultan is a professional ice hockey team based in Astana, Kazakhstan. They play in the Chernyshev Division of the Eastern Conference in the Kontinental Hockey League (KHL). The team founded in 1999. Barys is owned by Kazakhstan Temir Zholy (Kazakhstan Rail Ways), Nurlan Orazbayev is their president, Vadim Gusseinov is their general manager, Andrei Nazarov is their head coach and Brandon Bochenski is the team captain.

There have been 11 head coaches for the team. The Barys's first head coach was Nikolai Myshagin, who coached for four seasons. Alexander Vysotsky is the first Barys head coach to have won the major trophy. He guided Barys to Kazakhstan Hockey Championship win in 2007. He is also coached the team at those inaugural season in the Kontinental Hockey League, however was replaced by Andrei Shayanov in mid-season. On June 4, 2013, Ari-Pekka Selin signed a 2-year contract and announced as a new head coach of Barys for 2013–14 KHL season. On June 18, 2014, the KHL reported that Andrei Nazarov would move from Donbass Donetsk to become the new head coach at Barys, replacing Ari-Pekka Selin who had been sacked as coach of the Kazakhstan men's national ice hockey team on June 11 for unsatisfactory result in the 2014 IIHF World Championship.

Key

Coaches

Notes
 A running total of the number of coaches of Barys. Thus any coach who has two or more separate terms as head coach is only counted once.

References